Gorodeya Stadium is a stadium in Gorodeya, Minsk Oblast, Belarus. It is currently used for football matches and is the home ground of FC Gorodeya. The stadium holds 1,625 spectators.

History
The stadium was built and opened in 2006 and has been used by local club FC Gorodeya ever since. Stadium's original capacity was only 300. After renovations in 2011, additional stands were built to increase capacity to 1,050. Further renovations were done in 2016, preparing the stadium for Belarusian Premier League, after which the capacity increased to current 1,625.

External links
 Stadium profile at FC Gorodeya website
 Stadium profile at pressball.by

Football venues in Belarus
Buildings and structures in Minsk Region
2006 establishments in Belarus
Sports venues completed in 2006